This is a list of islands of Fujian under the administrative rule of the People's Republic of China. Islands currently administered by the Republic of China as part of the Fujian Province are not included.

Fuzhou

Lianjiang County

Huangqi
Islands in Huangqi include:
Donggu Jiao / Donggujiao Qundao 
Houyu Dao 
Jinsha Niuyu Dao 
Jinsha Qundao 
Niuweidongyu Dao 
Pingkuai Yu 
Pingniuweiyu Dao 
Sanyayu Dao 
Shangjiaoyu Dao 
Shujiaoyu Dao 
Shukuai Yu 
Yangtan Dao 
Yuanshanzaiyu Dao 
Zhijiao Yu

Tailu
Islands in Tailu include:

Daniuyu Dao 
Datan ( / ) 
Dongluo Dao 
Guojiang Yu 
Guo Yu (Guoyu Dao;  / ) 

Hengchengjiao Dao 
Kedou Yu 
Nanliuyu Dao 
Nanwei Yu (Nanweiyu Dao;  / ) 
Santan Dao 
Shuangjiyu Dao 
Sitan Dao 
Xiaoniujiaoyu Dao 
Yang Yu (Yangyu Dao;  / ) 
Yangyue Dao 
Zhiluo Dao ( / )

Pingtan County
Pingtan Island
Niushan Island

Ningde

Xiapu County

Haidao Township
Islands in Haidao Township include:
Xiyang Island, also known as Spider Island (Zhizhu Island, Chih-chu Tao) 
Fuying Island, also known as Double Peak Island (Shuangfeng Island) 
the Sishuang Islands (Sishuang Liedao, Pei-shuang Lieh-tao)
 Beishuang Island (Pei-shuang) 
 Dongshuang Island (Tung-shuang) 
 Xishuang Island (Hsi-shuang) 
 Nanshuang Island (Nan-shuang) 
Xiaoxiyang Island, also known as Isthmus Island (Yisimasi Island, I-ssu-ma-ssu Tao) 
Kuishan Island (Kuishan Dao), also known as Zhuishan (Chui Shan) 
Maci Island (Ma Chick) 
Nigu Island (Nu Geu Sen) 
Wu Island (Inside Island) 
Ma'an Island 
Dadong Island

Putian

Xiuyu District
Inhabited islands in the Xiuyu District include:
Meizhou Island, the legendary birthplace of the goddess Matsu and a famous pilgrimage  site
Nanri Island, site of the Battle of Nanri Island in October 1952
Xiaori Island, north of Nanri Island
Xigaobei Island
Donggaobei Island
Huanggua Island
Da'ao Islet
Dongluopan Island
Chishan
Shanle Islet

Uninhabited islands in the district include:
(The Wuqiu Islands are a rural township of Kinmen County, Fujian, Republic of China (Taiwan). The islands are claimed by the PRC.)
 Lida Islet
 Lixiao Islet
 Baimian Islet
 Etou
 Dongjiaoshan
 Tayuzaiqiao
 Huangqiqing Islet
 Tinggangqing Islet
 Ai Islet
 Zao Islet
 Dingbanshiduo
 Houqing Islet
 Jilong Islet
 Shifojiao
 Fushiduo
 Li Islet
 Liaohou Island
 Niu Islet
 Shiqiujiao
 Jiangqijiao
 Sanfan Islet
 Toujin Islet
 Shichengqing Islet
 Shichengda Islet
 Chenshiduo Islet
 Dongyuzi
 Ji Islet
 Mei Islet
 Lüxunwei Islet
 Da'angjiao
 Neiyuzi
 Waiyuzi
 Luoxun Islet
 Meihuashiduo
 Majiao Islet
 Heng Islet
 Niao Islet
 Yuanlianshiduo
 Hou Islet
 Dongtou Islet
 Baishiduo
 Bai Islet
 Yuehe Island
 Zhuganjiao
 Batoushan
 Xiao'ao Islet
 Jimu Islet
 Long'ershiduo
 Gaolingpai Islet
 Xiluopan Islet
 Gewei Islet
 Xiaohengsha Islet
 Weidun Islet
 Hengsha Islet
 Xiaomin Islet
 Damin Islet
 Chizi Islet
 Chishanzi
 Xiaoyue Islet
 Dongdu Islet
 Dongyue Islet
 Dalu Islet
 Dongsha Islet
 Weisha Islet
 Xiaomai Islet
 Damai Islet
 Niushishiduo
 Haizuzi Island
 Dashiting
 Gushanzi
 Weishan
 Fu Islet
 Hailong Islet
 Datiejiao Islet
 Heishiduo
 Huzi Islet
 Dazhong Islet
 Yan Islet
 Yanshan Island
 Xiaozhong Islet
 Libiao Islet
 Waibiao Islet
 Yangyuzi
 Yang Islet
 Xiawei Islet
 Shashiduo
 Jijia Islet
 Chi Islet
 Dongchuanbaimian Islet
 Beiding Islet
 Yuziweishiduo
 Nanding Islet
 Xixiayuzi
 Dongxiayuzi
 Jianziyu
 Hong Islet
 Wu Islet
 Huang Islet
 Hujiaojiao
 Huangniuyujiao
 Yushan
 Shiliu Islet
 Waishiduo Islet
 Wenjiada Islet
 Xiao Islet
 Hushi Islet
 Chiyushan
 Waibai Islet
 Libai Islet
 Xiaoding Islet
 Gongdan Islet
 Zhong Islet
 Yangyushan
 Hou Islet
 Dading Islet
 Tiedingzi Islet
 Jishijiao
 Jin Islet
 Shimen Islet
 Hongshan
 Gui Islet
 Shi Island
 Talinqing Islet
 Dabaishiduo
 Menxia Islet
 Pan Islet
 Cai Islet
 Ping Islet

Quanzhou

Nan'an
Islands in Nan'an include:
 Kui Yu  
 Dabai Yu ( or ) 
 Xiaobai Yu ( or )

Xiamen

Xiang'an

Dadeng Subdistrict
The Dadeng (Tateng) Islands are claimed as part of Kinmen County (Quemoy) by Taiwan (ROC). China (PRC) has administered the islands since 1949.

Dadeng Subdistrict is made up of offshore islands and islets including:
Dadeng (Tateng, Twalin)
Xiaodeng (Hsiaoteng, Town I.)
Jiaoyu/Jiao Yu (Chiao I., Reef I. )
Baihajiao

Zhangzhou

Longhai

Gangwei
Islands in Gangwei include:
 Bai Yu
 Shuangyu Dao, man-made island 
 Pozao Yu
 Wu'an Yu
 Wu Yu (Wu Hsu; /)  (south of Dadan Island and Erdan Island in Lieyu Township, Kinmen County, Taiwan (ROC))
 Xiaopozao Yu

See also
 List of islands of China

References

Fujian